The 1921 Campeonato Gaúcho was the third season of Rio Grande do Sul's top association football league. Grêmio won the title for the first time.

Format 

The championship was contested by the four regional champions in a single round-robin system, with the team with the most points winning the title. If two teams finished with the same number of points, a tie-breaking match would be played.

Qualified teams 

Juventude, Nacional and FC Montenegro were eliminated in the First Region Championship.
Rio-Grandense, Guarany de Bagé and Sport Club 247 from São Gabriel were eliminated in the Second Region Championship.
7 de Setembro from Tupanciretã, Guarany de Cruz Alta and Cachoeira FC were eliminated in the Third Region Championship.
14 de Julho, Quaraí FC and Guarani de Alegrete were eliminated in the Fourth Region Championship.

Championship

References 

Campeonato Gaúcho seasons
1921 in Brazilian football leagues